"Wilbury Twist" is a song by the British–American supergroup the Traveling Wilburys and is the final track on their 1990 album Traveling Wilburys Vol. 3. The song was also released in March 1991 as the second single from that album.

Music video 
The original music video featured cameos from many contemporary celebrities including Jimmy Nail, Woody Harrelson, Whoopi Goldberg, Fred Savage, Ben Savage, Kala Savage, Thomas Guzman-Sanchez of Rhythm Tribe, Milli Vanilli, Cheech Marin, John Candy and Eric Idle. The band and special cameos were shot at the Wilshire Ebell Theatre in Los Angeles. The DVD video in the 2007 box set The Traveling Wilburys Collection retains only a few introductory shots of John Candy and Eric Idle, otherwise simply showing the band members performing the song.

Track listings
 7" W0018W / 054391933973
 "Wilbury Twist"
 "New Blue Moon" (instrumental)
 CD W0018CD / 093624004424, 12" W0018T / 093624004400
 "Wilbury Twist"
 "New Blue Moon" (instrumental)
 "Cool Dry Place"

Charts

References

1991 singles
Traveling Wilburys songs
Song recordings produced by George Harrison
Song recordings produced by Jeff Lynne
Songs written by Bob Dylan
Songs written by George Harrison
Songs written by Jeff Lynne
Songs written by Tom Petty
1990 songs
Warner Records singles
Songs about dancing
Twist (dance)